Blown for Good: Behind the Iron Curtain of Scientology is a memoir written by Marc Headley,  a former Scientologist and Sea Org member, about his life and experiences in the Church of Scientology. It was self-published in the United States on November 5, 2009.

Background

Marc Headley was raised in Los Angeles, California. Headley's mother was a Scientologist, and she raised him within the church from an early age. He began work as an employee for the church at age 16. Headley soon  after joined the Sea Org and worked at the international headquarters of Scientology in Hemet, California, for 15 years. Headley escaped from the international headquarters of the organization in 2006. He was escorted to the safety of a car rental shop by the police during his escape from the organization.

In Headley v. Church of Scientology International, the 9th Circuit Court of Appeals wrote, "The record overwhelmingly shows that the Headleys joined and voluntarily worked for the [Sea Organization] because they believed that it was the right thing to do, because they enjoyed it, and because they thought that by working they were honoring the commitment that they each made and to which they adhered." The court also noted that the Headleys had private quarters outside the base, and had access to vehicles and multiple opportunities to leave.

Contents

The book's title is a reference to the Scientology terms "blow" or "blown," which describe one who leaves Scientology without prior authorization from the organization.

Headley recounts episodes from his years as a member of the Church of Scientology, most of that time as part of the order called the Sea Organization, or Sea Org. He details his experiences while working hundred-hour weeks at Scientology's secluded international headquarters known as Gold Base (or "Int Base") at Gilman Hot Springs, California, about eighty miles southeast of Los Angeles.

The book includes a foreword written by former high-ranking Scientology official Mark Rathbun.

Golden Era Productions

Headley worked out of the film-production studio facilities of Scientology from 1989 through 2005. He held multiple positions while employed by Scientology at Gold Base, mainly focused on the production of video and audio materials to disseminate the message of Scientology founder L. Ron Hubbard. He helped originate scripts of videos to introduce new members to Scientology methodology.  He also supervised large scale Scientology public events presided over by Scientology's leader David Miscavige. Headley reproduced thousands of copies of audio recordings of speeches by Hubbard.

2004 Tom Cruise video

The author describes a 2004 event where Tom Cruise was awarded the organization's Medal of Valor from David Miscavige, the video of which was leaked to the Internet in January 2008. Initially, the video intended for the event featured Cruise and other celebrities including Will Smith appearing on camera and praising the actor. Miscavige disapproved and instructed Scientology staff to create a video where Cruise would speak about himself and his views on being a Scientologist. "Dave Miscavige later said that his Tom Cruise video was one of the most important videos that had ever been produced," writes Headley.

Departure from Scientology

Headley states he gained approval to sell old Scientology materials on eBay to recoup money for the organization – he was later accused of embezzlement for doing this. In 2005, when he knew he would be faced with being sent to the organization's prison-like program the Rehabilitation Project Force, Headley decided to leave. Headley worried that leaving Scientology would mean becoming separated from his wife Claire, to whom he had been married for 13 years, and other family members in accordance with the Scientology practice of disconnection. Headley alleges that he left Gold Base on his motorcycle but was followed by Scientology security guards, which resulted in Headley falling off his bike by the side of the road. Riverside County, California Sheriff's arrived, and they helped Headley safely get further away from the Scientology compound. From there, he traveled to his father in Kansas City. He was later reunited with his wife who had also been an employee at Gold Base. Prior to his wife's departure from Gold Base, she was monitored closely day and night by the organization.

The author credits multiple sources for introducing doubts about his conditions while living at Gold Base. He writes that he listened to The John and Ken Show on KFI, and that their discussion of Scientology allowed him to think more critically during his time at the compound. He says that viewing Conan O'Brien make fun of Scientology celebrities changed his views on individuals that the organization had only spoken of internally with reverence.

Scientology response

When Headley and a Danish film crew went to the Gold Base, Headley was confronted by several members of Gold staff, including base spokesperson Catherine Fraser, who said Headley's account of his escape was untrue."Marc lived in another place, not even on the property, another place altogether," Fraser said in one of the [video clips of the incident]. "And that day when I explained that to the sheriff -- the sheriff looked at me and said, 'Oh, you mean he could have left at any time?' I said, 'Yes, he could have left at any time and he did.'"

After reviewing the evidence, the 9th Circuit agreed with the Scientologists that the Headleys lived outside the base, they had many opportunities to leave the Gold staff, and they had no problem leaving on their first try.

Suppressive Person declaration

In an interview on The John and Ken Show on KFI, Headley was asked if he experienced retaliation from Scientology for speaking critically about the organization. He said that he had been issued a declaration that he was to be considered a "Suppressive Person" by members of the organization, and explained, "That's basically the thing that goes out to anyone and everyone who is in Scientology, saying, 'This person is a Suppressive Person, and you can no longer speak to him ever again.' If you are in Scientology, and you speak to somebody who is a Suppressive Person, you yourself can be declared a Suppressive Person." Headley said when he left Scientology the organization gave him a "freeloader statement", a bill for US$62,000, for courses he had received in Scientology. "It's actually illegal, because they are basically charging me for on-the-job training – in California you can't charge somebody for on-the-job training. It's of no real value, but you don't know that, when you're in Scientology. You think, 'Are they going to garnish my wages, are they going to sue me?' You don't know," said Headley.

Reception

The book was self-published November 5, 2009, and was made available through the author's website at www.blownforgood.com and on Amazon.com. Blown for Good was selected as a finalist in the 2009 "Book of the Year Awards", by ForeWord Magazine. The editor in chief of The Village Voice, Tony Ortega, described the book as a "remarkable account". Ortega noted, "Headley's story provides a damning account of life working for Scientology ..." He concluded the review by commenting, "Perhaps the best service that Headley provides with Blown for Good is giving non-Scientologists the sense of what it's really like to work, day in and day out, in such a strange organization, from the lowliest laborer mucking out excrement in a Gold Base pond (Headley says shit was coming out of his ears and pores for days) to what kind of luxuries the celebrities and high-ranking members enjoy."

On the KFI talk radio program The John and Ken Show, commentators John Kobylt and Ken Chiampou talked about Blown for Good and discussed Scientology. Paul Beaumont, Toni O'Loughlin, and Paul Harris of The Observer commented that Headley's book, "details – as others have – allegations of systematic abuse and bizarre episodes" of experiences in Scientology. They noted, "Headley's book follows a year in which Scientology has been plagued by unwelcome revelations from high-profile defectors and fresh media investigation into its practices." Catholic Online associate editor and former Archbishop of the Charismatic Episcopal Church, Randy Sly, characterized Blown for Good as "a bold insider memoir". Sly reported on criticism of Scientology in the Australian Senate by Senator Nick Xenophon, and commented, "Headley provides vivid accountings of activities within Scientology that confirm the Australian Senator’s concerns." Sly noted, "A number of comments left on the Amazon.com website were from those who indicated they were ex-Scientologists and confirmed the author’s accounts." Ian Punnett of Coast to Coast AM commented that the song "We Gotta Get out of This Place", "certainly would be a theme of several of the chapters of Blown for Good".

Hamilton Nolan of Gawker described the book's design as "featuring a dramatic, action-scene-type cover", and called the work "a new tell-all book". Star described Blown for Good as an "explosive new book". The Flemish daily newspaper published in Belgium, De Standaard, noted the book discusses "remarkable experiences" the author underwent as a Scientology staff member. In a 2010 article in New Humanist, Paul Sims noted, "Since its release at the end of last year, Blown for Good has made the kind of impact its author hoped. Having built up an online buzz courtesy of Anonymous, and sold thousands of copies in the US, Headley says he has been receiving letters and emails from Scientologists, many of whom have said the revelations in his book have confirmed their suspicions about the inner workings of the Church."

About the author 

After leaving Scientology, Headley wrote about his experiences in Scientology. His writings were published in the media including news magazines, publications on the internet and other websites. In 2008, Headley was invited to speak in Hamburg, Germany, at a conference discussing abuses within Scientology, alongside actor and former Scientologist Jason Beghe.

As of 2023, Headley lives in Colorado with his wife and three sons, and is the CEO of MODE Systems.

Headley continues to speak out about his experiences in Scientology, including being featured on an episode of Leah Remini: Scientology and the Aftermath, and running a YouTube channel called "Blown for Good - Exposing Scientology Since 2006!".

Headley is a Board Member of The Aftermath Foundation. The Aftermath Foundation helps former Sea Org members get back on their feet after having no contact with the outside world as they usually don't have an employment history, credit history, bank account, driver's license or sometimes even a formal education.

See also

Scientology and the legal system
Scientology controversies

References

External links

Youtube channel for BlownForGood
Riverside County Sheriff's Department Police Reports regarding Marc Headley's Escape, Scribd

2009 non-fiction books
Books critical of Scientology
Books about Scientology
Self-published books
2009 in religion
Books about California
American memoirs